Ere Gowda is a Kannada film director known for his award-winning Kannada movie Balekempa. He was also the screenwriter of the award-winning Kannada film Thithi directed by Raam Reddy.

He is also a motivational speaker. and has given talks at INK talks and several international conferences. His film Balekempa was listed under the ten most notable films at IFFR.

Early career 
Ere Gowda worked as a security guard in Mysore after finishing his schooling due to family financial problems. Later he moved to Bangalore, where he worked under Anita Reddy, a well known social worker. After finding that Gowda was interested in photography and camera work, Anita Reddy gave him a chance to document the activities of several nonprofit organizations around Bangalore. Gowda's dedication and interest in film making gave him a chance to work in several short films with her son Raam Reddy.

Filmmaking career
In 2015 when Raam Reddy completed his film studies at Prague Film School, they worked together to make the film Thithi. In 2017 Gowda wrote and directed his next Kannada movie Balekempa. The film has won several awards and is expected to be in theaters in 2019.

Films and awards

References

Indian filmmakers
Living people
Year of birth missing (living people)